Phoenix sylvestris  (sylvestris - Latin, of the forest) also known as silver date palm, Indian date, sugar date palm or wild date palm, is a species of flowering plant in the palm family native to southern Pakistan, most of India, Sri Lanka, Nepal, Bhutan, Myanmar and Bangladesh. It is also reportedly naturalized in Mauritius, the Chagos Archipelago, Puerto Rico and the Leeward Islands. Growing in plains and scrubland up to 1300 m above sea level, the fruit from this palm species is used to make wine and jelly. The sap is tapped and drunk fresh or fermented into toddy. The fresh sap is boiled to make palm jaggery in West Bengal state of India and Bangladesh.

Description
Phoenix sylvestris ranges from 4 to 15 m in height and 40 cm in diameter; not as large as the Canary Island Date Palm, but nearly so, and resembling it. The leaves are 3 m long, gently recurved, on 1 m petioles with acanthophylls near the base.  The leaf crown grows to 10 m wide and 7.5 to 10 m tall containing up to 100 leaves. The inflorescence grows to 1 metre with white, unisexual flowers forming to a large, pendent infructescence. The single-seeded fruit ripens to a purple-red colour.

Gallery

References

External links

PACSOA Link
http://www.palmpedia.net/wiki/Phoenix_sylvestris

sylvestris
Trees of the Indian subcontinent
Trees of Myanmar
Plants described in 1832